Dysoxylum gaudichaudianum, commonly known as ivory mahogany, is a species of rainforest tree in the family Meliaceae, native to Malesia, Queensland, and some southwest Pacific islands.

Description
The bark is smooth and often has teaspoon-sized depressions in it.

The very large leaves are produced in whorls and clustered towards the ends of the branches. This arrangement produces large spherical clusters of foliage (see gallery).

The leaflets are highly asymmetric at the base with one side of the leaf blade wider than the other. They measure up to 

The flowers are a pale cream or green, 5-merous, with an unpleasant smell. The fruits are a capsule about  diameter which is covered in fine brown hairs.

Phenology
Flowering in Australia occurs from September to January, with fruits ripening around October to February.

Taxonomy
This species was originally described in 1868 by Friedrich Anton Wilhelm Miquel in the publication Annales Musei Botanici Lugduno-Batavi 4:15.

The genus name comes from the Latin dys meaning "bad", and the Ancient Greek xylon meaning "wood", and refers to the unpleasant smell produced by some species. The species epithet was given to honour French botanist Charles Gaudichaud-Beaupré.

Distribution and habitat
Occurs in Malesia, Christmas Island, Australia from the Cape York Peninsula to the Mary River, South East Queensland, and islands of the South-West Pacific, in lowland rainforest to 300m abl.

Gallery

References

External links
 
 
 View a map of recorded sightings of Dysoxylum gaudichaudianum at the Australasian Virtual Herbarium
 See images of Dysoxylum gaudichaudianum on Flickriver

gaudichaudianum
Trees of Australia
Flora of Queensland
Flora of Malesia